The 2018 Pacific Rim Gymnastics Championships is the fifteenth edition of the Pacific Rim Gymnastics Championships. The competition was held on April 27–29, 2018 at the Coliseo Iván de Bedout in Medellín, Colombia.

Background
The 2018 edition of the Pacific Rim Championships took place in Medellín, Colombia from April 27 - 29.

Venues 

The Pacific Rim Championships took place at Coliseo Iván de Bedout.

Schedule

Broadcast
FloGymnastics broadcast the event.

Participating nations
These nations participated in the competition: 

  Argentina
  Australia
  Canada
  Chile
  Chinese Taipei
  Colombia
  Costa Rica
  Cuba
  Ecuador
  Hong Kong
  Mexico
  Japan
  Mexico
  New Zealand
  Panama
  Peru
  United States

Medalists

Artistic gymnastics

Men's events

Women's events

Notes
Gymnasts from Cuba and Argentina were not eligible to win medals given they are not members of the Pacific Alliance of National Gymnastic Federations.

Rhythmic gymnastics

Trampoline

References

2018 in gymnastics
International gymnastics competitions hosted by the United States
Pacific Rim Championships